The modern history of newspapers in Korea dates back to at least the 19th century. Historically, newspapers were a reflection of their times and sometimes included conflicting values (i.e. pro and anti-Japanese, and democracy and anti-democracy sentiments).

1883–1910: The Enlightenment 
The Enlightenment period was from 1896 to 1910, before the Japanese colonial era.

Korea's first modern newspaper, Hanseong Sunbo, was first published in 1883 as the official mouthpiece of the Korean government, but was discontinued in 1884 after the Gapsin Coup failed. It later reemerged in 1886 as a weekly newspaper, the Hanseong Jubo (한성주보, 漢城周報), and used a mixture of Hangul and Hanja scripts. Its contents included editorials, news, literary commentary, and even advertisements.  

Later, sometime between 1896–1904, Tongnip Sinmun was founded by Seo Jae-pil, and between 1904–1910, Daehan Maeil Shinbo, Hwangseong press, and Daeguk press were founded against the Japanese.

Hanseong Sunbo 
Hanseong Sunbo was the first modern newspaper in Korea. It was published three times monthly by Park Mun-guk in Seoul beginning on October 31, 1883. Thereafter, it was published on the first day of each month.

In 1882, Park Young-hyo and his group visited Japan as receptionists (envoys sent to Japan during King Gojong's reign in the late Joseon Dynasty) and brought back several Japanese people, including journalists and printers, to help produce newspapers. Park, who was soon appointed to Hanseongbu Panyun after returning to Korea, frequently visited the palace and stressed the necessity of the newspaper to the king. On February 28, 1883, King Gojong ordered the Hansung Department to oversee the newspaper's publication.

The content was largely divided into domestic and international articles; the domestic articles often included government gazettes, private newsletters, and city council information, while the best articles of each country focused on war between "powerful" and "weak" countries, military equipment or defense measures, and civilization.

The newspaper stopped circulating in December 1884, more than a year after its launch due to the Gapsin Coup.

Hanseong Jubo 
As the first weekly newspaper in Korea, Hanseong Jubo was founded on January 25, 1886, in the form of a double edition of Hanseong Sunbo. The newspaper's founding address asserts that it has made its greatest mission to be loyal to the king and to enlighten the people. It is also issued by Park Mun-guk, and was established by the government to publish newspapers.

Tongnip Sinmun 

Tongnip Sinmun was the first private newspaper in Korea and was launched by Seo Jae-pil on April 7, 1896. It was the first newspaper published by civilians, and reflected a clear difference between the content and the way they are operated.

The newspaper was characterized by its emphasis on modern nationalism, democratic ideas, and independent modernization.

The paper also emphasized the urgency and importance of the new education, believing that education is the most urgent priority to strengthen the country and speed up the enlightenment. For the first time, it taught the people the idea of democracy and insisted on the need for national suffrage and the establishment of a parliament.

It emphasized several other ideals as well: the reform of social customs, such as the upsurge of public morality, national unity, rectification of the evil wind of slander, and cultivation of the attitude of living, contributing to society; the power of the country comes from the modern development of industry; the condemnation of bureaucratic tyranny and corruption; and the compliance and creation of a fair social climate.

Tongnip Sinmun also asserted that the international situation surrounding Korea at the time was in critical condition, and constantly raised awareness that there was a risk of losing independence without a national awakening, and emphasized caution against foreign influences.

When Tongnip Sinmun accused high-ranking government officials of corruption and denounced the invasion of interests by the powers, representing the interests of the nation and leading public opinion, disgruntled Russian legates and water poloists plotted Seo Jae-pil's expulsion, and relations with Japan worsened.

1910–1945: Japanese colonial era 

While private newspapers were published by Koreans, institutional newspapers were issued by the Japanese governor-general. As a result, they provided conflicting content.

Resistance press 
The Chosun Ilbo and The Dong-A Ilbo were published during the Japanese occupation. They were part of the three major national private newspapers alongside The Jegi Ilbo, which was founded by Choe Nam-seon in 1924, later published by 1936, with its title changed to The Joong-Ang Ilbo, JoongAng Ilbo, and Chosun JoongAng Ilbo. Until the Japanese government-general's forced closure of all Korean-issued private papers in August 1940, newspapers were a record of all the life of colonial Joseon, including politics, economy, culture, and education, as well as a window for introducing and bringing in foreign ideas, and being the center of the national movement. The newspaper companies were gathering places for talent and a presentation stage for literary works.

The governor-general's newspaper 

The Japanese governor-general rationalized, glorified, and promoted colonial rule by publishing three organ newspapers: Korean (Maeil Shinbo), Japanese (Gyeongseong Ilbo), and English (The Seoul Press). Government organs were important, and the diplomatic value in the Japanese occupation was the study of history. Maeil Shinbo was incorporated into the Gyeongseong Ilbo until it was spun off as an independent corporation in 1938, and managed by a Japanese president. After Korea's liberation from Japan's colonial rule, the title was changed to Seoul. Gyeongseong Ilbo was published in Japanese until December 10, 1945, just after the collapse of the Japanese colonial rule.

After the annexation of Korea, the Japanese government-general of Korea issued the Gyeongseong Ilbo, Maeil Shinbo, and The Seoul Press. The three organizations were established as separate newspapers before the annexation of Korea; after the annexation they promoted Japanese rule.

Korean independence 
Since Korea's independence from Japan's rule, numerous periodicals, including newspapers and magazines, have emerged in response to media oppression.

The media was divided into left and right wing factions.

Left-right confrontational press 

The left-wing group took the lead in the press by first taking control of the facilities for printing newspapers. The leading left-wing newspapers were The Chosun Ilbo and the Liberation Daily.

Founded on September 8, 1945, The Chosun Ilbo was founded by Korean employees working in the Gyeongseong Ilbo, which was first published by Kim Jeong-do, but in late October, Hong Jeung-sik, a prominent figure in the left-wing media community, changed to editor-in-chief and publisher.

The number of printing facilities immediately after Korea's liberation from Japanese rule was very small as most of them belonged to the Japanese. The Communist Party of Korea not only received the Gonozawa Printing Office in Sogong-dong, Seoul, which was the best facility at the time, but also recruited the publishing labor union.

The Chosun Ilbo was the first daily newspaper in Seoul after the August 15 Liberation, and on September 8, left-wing reporters from the Gyeongseong Ilbo, the official newspaper of the Japanese Government-General of Korea, were founded as tabloid Korean newspapers.

The Liberation Daily was founded in 1945 by the Central Committee of the Communist Party of Korea in Seoul.

1960–1980: Military government 

After May 16, 1961, the military government conducted a complete overhaul of newspapers and news agencies. A year later, the military government strongly pushed ahead with its media policy to reform the structure of the media, announcing a 25-point "press policy" and "press policy implementation standards". The Dong-A and Chosun incident occurred due to the intervention of government authorities, the press freedom protection movement, the suppression of advertisements, and labor-management conflicts.

Incidents 
On the surface, it was a conflict between the reporters and management of the two leading newspapers, Dong-A Ilbo and Chosun Ilbo. However, the incidents revealed problems faced by the media, such as the dismissal of a large number of journalists in the 1970s, as well as the discord between journalists and business owners.

Dong-A Ilbo incident 
The incident started directly with the union formation of reporters. On March 7, 1974, 33 reporters from the Dong-A Ilbo formed the Dong-A Ilbo Branch of the National Publishing Workers' Union. However, the company began to fire the reporters that supported Dong-A Ilbo's traditional policy of not recognizing labor unions. In protest, the union filed a lawsuit, which led to conflicts and more complex legal battles. In the midst of such labor-management conflicts, the Dong-A Ilbo dismissed and suspended reporters between March 10 and April 1975, forcing 134 reporters, producers, and announcers to leave the company.

The Chosun Ilbo incident 
At the same time, The Chosun Ilbo dismissed two journalists for "infringing their editorial rights". 58 journalists were then later dismissed or suspended indefinitely by the end of March 1975 due to worsening conflicts between management and reporters, with 33 reporters dismissed as they canceled disciplinary action.

Media integration and abandoned incident 
In 1980, the consolidation of newspapers, broadcasting, and telecommunications had all taken place under the leadership of the new military. Jun Doo-hwan's forces, which seized power due to the December 12 incident, established a press team led by Lee Sang-jae at the intelligence office of the security company in early 1980, merged media companies to control the media essential to the power struggle, and dismissed journalists who were resistant or critical of the military's position. The reason for the merger was that media companies became insolvent and a hotbed of corruption due to the turmoil of the media organizations. The voluntary closure or consolidation was a formality that was led by the New Military Department's security division. The new military, including Jun, was found to be part of a ruling scenario in which the government forcibly merged media outlets such as newspapers, broadcasters, and news agencies under the guise of improving the structure of the media to complete the rebellion of the new military forces.

References 

Mass media in Korea
History of Korea
History of mass media
History of newspapers